Alma Station was a base load coal power station in Alma, Wisconsin. The plant was built and operated by Dairyland Power Cooperative. Upon the completion of the plant's construction in 1947, it was the largest cooperatively owned power station in the world. Alma Station was decommissioned in 2014.

History
Alma Station was a Dairyland Power Cooperative power station completed in 1947 in the city of Alma, Wisconsin. Construction on Alma Station began in 1946. Initially planned as a $4.5 million (equivalent to $ million in ) project, the cost exceeded $5 million by the time of the plant's dedication in 1947. Construction of the plant was funded by the Rural Electrification Administration (REA), and a large amount of the land the plant would sit on was donated by the City of Alma. Built as a base load power station, the initial plant design had space for six coal-fired boilers. Two 15-megawatt (MW) boiler units were installed by the time the building was completed in October 1947, though the plant was supplying power before the facility was formally dedicated. Building the station led the City of Alma to construct additional housing and a new school for the families of the incoming workers.

An additional 15-MW unit was installed in 1951, and a 54-MW unit installed in 1957. Also in 1957, the Dairyland Power Cooperative received an $18.6 million (equivalent to $ million in ) loan from the REA to expand the station and increase the number of boilers, adding an 80-megawatt generation unit as part of the expansion. At the time, the loan was the largest ever issued by the REA. The new unit was put into service in January 1960. At its peak, the plant produced 214 MW of electricity.

In 1970, Wisconsin Attorney General Robert Warren sued the Dairyland Power Cooperative over the operation of Alma Station, saying the plant violated public nuisance laws due to air pollution from the burning coal and asked that pollution abatement equipment be installed at the plant. The Cooperative was dismissive of the claim, saying that Warren had picked their plant as a scapegoat to build interest in his reelection campaign and questioned why the only cooperatively owned power company in the state was chosen for the suit. Representatives for the Cooperative at the time said that a research study on pollution at the Alma plant was being finalized.

Alma Station began decommissioning its generation units in 2011, shelving its three oldest units that year. The plant ceased operations entirely in 2014. The plant's main building was demolished in 2017, and one of its two 700-foot tall smokestacks was demolished in 2018.

See also

List of power stations in Wisconsin

References

Energy infrastructure completed in 1947
Energy infrastructure completed in 1951
Energy infrastructure completed in 1957
Energy infrastructure completed in 1960
Buildings and structures in Buffalo County, Wisconsin
Coal-fired power stations in Wisconsin